Bulgaria is a European Parliament constituency for elections in the European Union covering the member state of Bulgaria. It is currently represented by seventeen Members of the European Parliament.

Current Members of the European Parliament

Elections

2007

The 2007 European election was Bulgaria's first election since joining the European Union on 1 January 2007 and was held on 20 May 2007.

The top two parties scored 5 seats each; Citizens for European Development of Bulgaria and Bulgarian Socialist Party, followed by the Movement for Rights and Freedoms with four, Ataka with three, and National Movement Simeon II (NDSV) with one. It was considered likely that the result of the election would cause a major political crisis in Bulgaria, due to the expected weak results of the National Movement.

2009

The 2009 European election was the seventh election to the European Parliament and the second for Bulgaria.

2014

The 2014 European election was the eighth election to the European Parliament and the third for Bulgaria.

2019

The 2019 European election was the ninth election to the European Parliament and the fourth for Bulgaria.

References

External links
 European Election News by European Election Law Association (Eurela)
 List of MEPs europarl.europa.eu

European Parliament elections in Bulgaria
European Parliament constituencies
2007 establishments in Bulgaria
Constituencies established in 2007